Jasna Đuričić (born 16 April 1966) is a Serbian actress and academic, best known for playing the titular role in the Bosnian film Quo Vadis, Aida?, which was nominated for the Academy Award for Best Foreign International Feature Film in 2021.

Biography 
Đuričić was born in Ruma,  Serbia. She graduated from the Academy of Arts at the University of Novi Sad in 1989, where she studied under the noted Serbian actor Branko Pleša, and where she is herself now a professor of acting. Đuričić was a permanent member of the Serbian National Theatre in Novi Sad from 1990 until 2005.

In 2014, she was awarded Dobrica's Ring (Serbian: Добричин прстен, Dobrichin prsten), a lifetime achievement award given to noted Serbian actors.  

At the 34th European Film Awards, Đuričić was awarded the Best Actress Award for her role in the Bosnian war film Quo Vadis, Aida?.

She currently lives in Novi Sad with her husband Boris Isaković, a fellow actor.

Selected filmography

Film

Awards
Best Actress Award at the Locarno International Film Festival for White White World (Beli beli svet) (2010)
Best Actress Prize at the Les Arcs International Film Festival for White White World (Beli beli svet) (2010)
Best Actress Award at the El Gouna Film Festival for Quo Vadis, Aida? (2020)
Best Actress Award at the 34th European Film Awards for Quo Vadis, Aida? (2021)

References

External links

1966 births
Living people
People from Ruma
Serbian film actresses
Miloš Žutić Award winners
Zoran Radmilović Award winners
Laureates of the Ring of Dobrica
Žanka Stokić award winners
European Film Award for Best Actress winners